Raghunathganj Assembly constituency is an assembly constituency in Murshidabad district in the Indian state of West Bengal.

Overview
As per orders of the Delimitation Commission, No. 59 Raghunathganj Assembly constituency covers Raghunathganj II community development block, Nurpur gram panchayat of Suti I community development block and Maiya gram panchayat of Lalgola community development block.

Raghunathganj Assembly constituency is part of No. 9 ...Jangipur (Lok Sabha constituency).

Members of Legislative Assembly

Election results

2011
In the 2011 election, Akhruz Zaman of Congress defeated his nearest rival Abul Hasnat of RSP.

References

Assembly constituencies of West Bengal
Politics of Murshidabad district